Raymond Peter Evans (21 June 1933 – 26 June 2009) was an English professional footballer who played as an inside forward in the Football League for Preston North End and Bournemouth.

Early life and career 
Evans was born in India while his Army father was serving in the country, but was raised in the New Hall Lane area of Preston.

After starting as a youth at Preston North End, Evans signed a part-time professional contract in May 1951 and played for the club until his transfer to Bournemouth in 1959. He and goalkeeper Mick Lynn were sold for a combined £4,000. He later played for Morecambe.

He died on 26 June 2009, five days after his 76th birthday.

References

1933 births
2009 deaths
Footballers from Preston, Lancashire
English footballers
Association football inside forwards
Preston North End F.C. players
AFC Bournemouth players
Morecambe F.C. players